Parfrey is a surname. Notable people with the surname include:

 Adam Parfrey (1957–2018), American journalist, editor and publisher
 Kevin Parfrey, Canadian rugby player
 Patrick Parfrey (born 1950), Canadian physician
 Woodrow Parfrey (1922–1984), American film and television actor

See also
 Parfrey's Glen, Wisconsin - United States' first natural area, managed by the Devil's Lake State Park